The Constitution of Kuwait supports the existence of political parties, although political parties in Kuwait have not been legalized since independence in 1961. Nonetheless, the constitution itself does not prohibit parties.

In practice, there are many de facto political parties:

Current parties

Outlawed parties

See also
 Politics of Kuwait
 List of political parties by country

References

Kuwait
 
Political parties
Political parties
Kuwait